Several ships of the Austrian, Prussian, and German navies have been named SMS Salamander:

, a Prussian 
, a Prussian gunboat
, an Austrian 
, a German armored gunboat
, an Austrian minelayer

Austro-Hungarian Navy ship names
German Navy ship names